Max Clendinning (26 September 1924 in County Armagh, Northern Ireland – 4 June 2020) was an architect and interior designer.

Clendinning is best known for his 1965 design of the "slot-together but sturdy looking" Maxima chair, inspired in part by computer lettering. This design was featured in an exhibit at the Victoria & Albert Museum in 2012. He also created designs for Christian Dior and Liberty & Co and, for London Midland Region of British Railways, the laminated wooden roofs at Manchester Oxford Road railway station (1960).

He has lived in Islington with partner Ralph Adron for forty years.

References

20th-century architects from Northern Ireland
British interior designers
2020 deaths
1924 births
People from County Armagh
British railway architects